Philip Edgcumbe Hughes (1915–1990) was an Anglican clergyman and New Testament scholar whose life spanned four continents: Australia, where he was born; South Africa, where he spent his formative years; England, where he was ordained; and the United States, where he died in 1990, aged 75.

Career

Hughes was born in Sydney in 1915, one of two twin boys born to the literary critic Randolph William Hughes and Muriel Hughes (née Stanley Hall). He received his BA, MA, and DLH degrees from the University of Cape Town, his BD degree from the University of London, and his Th.D. degree from the Australian College of Theology.

Hughes grew up in South Africa, and took his first degree there just before the Second World War. While there he was a member of the Church of England in South Africa, he briefly served as one of its ministers, and he was a commissary to the CESA Presiding Bishop.

In 1940 Hughes moved to England to attend Tyndale Hall, Bristol, and was ordained priest in 1941. After some years of pastoral work, he returned to the institution from 1947 to 1953 as tutor and Vice-principal. Along with Geoffrey Bromiley and Stafford Wright, he established an enviable reputation for Tyndale Hall as a conservative evangelical college with a serious interest in theology and a loyalty to historic Anglicanism.

From 1953 to 1956 he was Secretary of Church Society; and from 1959 to 1967 editor of Church Society’s journal, The Churchman.

From 1964 he moved to the United States to teach at American seminaries, including Columbia Theological Seminary, Decatur, Georgia (1964-1968), Westminster Theological Seminary, Philadelphia, PA, Gordon-Conwell Theological Seminary, South Hamilton, MA, and Trinity School for Ministry, Ambridge, PA.

While living and teaching in Pennsylvania, he was Associate Rector at St. John's Episcopal Church, Huntingdon Valley.

In theology Hughes was a firm Calvinist, but had the breadth of sympathies of a true scholar. As a staunch Anglican, he threw himself into the life of The Episcopal Church (United States) and sought to strengthen the cause of orthodoxy there in difficult times. His writings are solid in substance and graceful in prose style. His Greek was excellent, and three of his chief books are commentaries on the Second Epistle to the Corinthians, the Epistle to the Hebrews, and the Book of Revelation. In doctrine, his great work is The True Image: The Origin and Destiny of Man in Christ, on the Christian doctrine of man. He wrote studies on the precursors of the Reformers: Lefèvre: Pioneer of Ecclesiastical Renewal in France and an unpublished thesis on Pico della Mirandola. He also translated Pierre-Charles Marcel's Biblical Doctrine of Infant Baptism, which had great influence. For some years he ably edited The Churchman.

Personal life

Hughes and his wife Margaret had one daughter, Marion. In his leisure time he enjoyed playing the piano.

He died in 1990 in Rydal, Pennsylvania.

Selected works

Books

 ?
 ?

 ?

 - It is now out of print and will be replaced in the series by D. A. Carson’s treatment of Revelation.

Articles

References

External links

1915 births
1990 deaths
20th-century English Anglican priests
Academic journal editors
Alumni of the University of London
Australian biblical scholars
Columbia Theological Seminary faculty
Editors of Christian publications
Evangelical Anglican biblical scholars
Evangelical Anglican clergy
Gordon–Conwell Theological Seminary faculty
University of Cape Town alumni
Westminster Theological Seminary faculty